Constance I (2 November 1154 – 27 November 1198) was reigning Queen of Sicily from 1194–98, jointly with her spouse from 1194 to 1197, and with her infant son Frederick II, Holy Roman Emperor, in 1198, as the heiress of the Norman kings of Sicily. She was also Holy Roman Empress and later Dowager by marriage to Henry VI, Holy Roman Emperor.

When she was young, as the sole heir to the throne of Sicily, she didn't marry until she was 30 because of an ominous prophecy; shortly after becoming empress she was involved in the succession war against her illegitimate nephew King Tancred of Sicily for the Sicilian throne, during which, rarely for an empress, she was captured during such an offensive campaign, though finally without danger she escaped. In the history of Holy Roman Empire only two empresses had ever been captured, the other being her mother-in-law Empress Beatrice.

Shortly before ascending the Sicilian throne, at the advanced age of 40, she gave birth to her only child – Frederick, thus continuing the bloodlines of both Holy Roman Empire and Kingdom of Sicily.

After the death of her husband, she gave up the throne of the Holy Roman Empire in the name of her son, despite him being King of the Romans, in favor of her younger brother-in-law Philip of Swabia, making her son merely King of Sicily; meanwhile she still claimed herself Holy Roman Empress Dowager. Passing away merely one year later, she entrusted her young son to Pope Innocent III.

Background and Marriage 
Constance was the posthumous daughter of Roger II by his third wife Beatrice of Rethel.

Constance, unusually for a princess, was not betrothed until she was thirty, which later gave rise to stories that she had become a nun and required papal dispensation to marry. Boccaccio related in his De mulieribus claris that a prediction that "her marriage would destroy Sicily" led to her confinement to a convent as a nun from childhood to remain celibate, and by 15th century Santissimo Salvatore, Palermo, managed to claim Constance as a former member, which was assured by Giovanni Antonio Summonte. Meanwhile, Mary Taylor Simeti suggested that Constance, viewed as a potential heir to the throne and a valuable pawn to international diplomacy, would not be lightly ceded.

In the spring of 1168 when her elder nephew King William II was reigning, in Messina, the opposition against Chancellor Stephen du Perche was growing more and more, and a rumor spread that William was murdered and the chancellor planned to put his brother on the throne, who would marry Constance to legitimate his claim, despite the existence of Henry of Capua brother of William. Stephen was finally forced to flee.

Henry died in 1172, as King William II did not marry until 1177 and his marriage remained childless (or ever had a son named Bohemond in 1181), Constance became the sole heir to the Sicilian crown; nonetheless, while said to have been designated the heir and sworn fealty to in 1174, she remained confined to her convent with her marriage seemingly beyond consideration until she was 30-year-old.

Her betrothal to Henry, King of the Romans, was announced 29 Oct 1184 at the Augsburg episcopal palace, an event that Pope Lucius III initiated rather than objected. In 1185 Constance traveled to Milan to celebrate the wedding accompanied by a grand procession of princes and barons. Henry accompanied her to Salerno in August but had to return to Germany for the funeral of his mother. On August 28 Constance was greeted in the Province of Rieti by ambassadors from the Emperor. Henry and Constance were married on 27 January 1186 at Basilica of Sant'Ambrogio, Milan. In exchange for the marriage Frederick agreed to relinquish his claim to Southern Italy. Before leaving Sicily William II had three main nobles — his cousin Tancred, Count of Lecce, Roger of Andria and vice chancellor Matthew of Ajello swear fealty to her as the probable successor to the throne at the curia of Troia. Matthew strongly opposed this marriage. Abulafia (1988) points out that William did not foresee the union of German and Sicilian crowns as a serious eventuality; his purpose was to consolidate an alliance, with an erstwhile enemy of Norman power in Italy. Another aim of William to marry Constance off was to prevent Tancred from claiming the throne.

Constance interceded the succession conflict of her maternal-granduncle Count Henry of Namur with her husband and father-in-law: Henry had designated his maternal-nephew Baldwin V, Count of Hainaut as his heir while childless, but he had a daughter Ermesinde in 1186 and thus sought to replace Baldwin with her. Under the instruction of Frederick I Baldwin succeeded Namur in 1189 while Henry was still living.

The papacy, also an enemy of the emperors, did not want to see the kingdom of southern Italy (then one of the richest in Europe) in German hands, but Henry pressed Pope Celestine III to baptize and crown his son; the Pope put him off.

Claim to Sicily 
Knowing that Sicily's Norman aristocracy would not welcome a Hohenstaufen king, William made the nobles, and the important men of his court, promise to recognize Constance's succession if he died without direct heirs. Nevertheless, after his unexpected death in 1189, Tancred seized the throne. Tancred was illegitimate but he had the support of most of the great men of the kingdom such as Vice-Chancellor Matthew of Ajello. On the other hand, Archbishop Walter of the Mill and most of the aristocracy supported Constance. Matthew was able to induce Walter and other barons to support Tancred.

Joan of England, widow of William, believed Constance to be the rightful successor and vocally supported the Germans; in response Tancred put Queen Joan under house arrest and confiscated her vast estates, which enraged her brother King Richard I of England.

First expedition 
While Constance's father-in-law, Frederick Barbarossa, was on a crusade, Henry and Constance were forced to stay in Germany and could not press her claim to Sicily. Emperor Frederick died in 1190 and the following year Henry and Constance were crowned emperor and empress. Constance then accompanied her husband at the head of a substantial imperial army to forcefully take the Sicilian throne from Tancred with the support of the loyal Pisa fleet. The northern towns of Sicily opened their gates to Henry, including the earliest Norman strongholds Capua and Aversa. Salerno, Roger II's mainland capital, sent word ahead that Henry was welcome and invited Constance to stay in her father's old palace to escape the summer heat, and take treatment from doctors for her infirm health. Welcomed as though, Constance felt many citizens were still loyal to Tancred as they whispered in groups quietly.

At Naples Henry met the first resistance of the whole campaign, and were held up well into the southern summer from May to August, by which time much of the army had succumbed to malaria and disease. Even Henry himself fell ill; Henry of Welf, who was also participating in the siege of Naples, deserted to Germany and falsely claimed that the emperor had died and tried to underline his own abilities as a possible successor. Although Henry VI recovered, as a result, the imperial army was forced to withdraw from Sicily altogether. Constance remained in Salerno with a small garrison as a sign that Henry would soon return.

Brief captivity 
Once Henry had withdrawn with the bulk of the imperial army the towns that had supposedly fallen to the Empire immediately declared their allegiance to Tancred, for the most part now fearing his retribution. Nicholas of Ajello, son of Matthew and former Archbishop of Salerno, who was helping defend Naples, wrote letters about the events to his friends in Salerno. Thus the populace of Salerno saw an opportunity to win some favour with Tancred, so they taunted and besieged the defenseless Constance at Castel Terracena. Constance presented herself on a balcony and spoke to them in the tone of mild remonstrance and admonition, trying to tell them that the situation might improve and the defeat of Henry might be exaggerated by Nicholas, but the Salernitans were determined to capture her for Tancred, so they continued the siege. Constance locked herself in her room, locked the windows, and prayed to God for help and revenge. After a rapid negotiation with Elia di Gesualdo, a distant relative of Tancred, Constance voluntarily went out under the condition that her German garrison were to be allowed to leave unharmed. She was then arrested by Elia (and some barons of Apulia who were related to her) and delivered to Tancred in Messina by Admiral Margaritus of Brindisi (her brother-in-law who had helped in the defence of Naples), on a bireme galley or dromon with 200 rowers. She was in her attire as empress, wearing a dress quilted with gold and decorated with roses, a cloak covered with precious jewels, and her hair was strewn with gems, making her look like a goddess. Thus she became an important and valuable prize given that Henry had every intention of returning. When meeting Constance Tancred blamed her for the invasion, but she proudly responded that she was just taking back her dominion robbed by Tancred. By September 20 Henry learned the abduction of his wife at Genoa.

Constance was taken to Palermo, supervised by Queen Sibylla; Tancred had her eat with Sibylla and sleep in Sibylla's bedroom. Sibylla, who had once quarrelled with Constance, after seeing that the populace of Palermo was showing sympathy to Constance, suggested that Tancred put Constance to death. Tancred disagreed, worrying that this would harm his popularity. So under the suggestion of Tancred, Sibylla went on a discussion with Matthew of Ajello, who had been promoted to chancellor, where to imprison Constance. Matthew wrote a letter to Tancred in her presence, suggesting him to lock Constance in the Castel dell'Ovo in Naples in the custody of nobleman Aligerno Cottone so as to be better-guarded since the castle was surrounded by water, meanwhile had her secluded from Sicilian people. Tancred accepted their suggestion. In addition Matthew wrote to Aligerno ordering him to "ut imperatricem in Castro Salvatoris ad mare benè custodiat" (guard the empress in Castle of the Savior (i. e. Castel dell'Ovo) in the sea properly).

Although Tancred always treated her with courtesy during her captivity, Constance was under extremely careful guard. Sibylla strongly opposed the deference Tancred showed to Constance, believing this would implicitly acknowledge the claims of the latter.

During the election of a new bishop of Liege in September 1191 Henry favored Albert de Rethel, a maternal uncle of the Empress Constance, whom both he and Constance had planned to make the next bishop of Liege, however, as mentioned above, at the time of the election, Constance had been imprisoned by the Sicilians, and the other candidate, Albert of Louvain, gained more support. In January 1192 Henry claimed the election was under dispute and appointed his newly made imperial chancellor Lothar of Hochstaden, provost of the church of St Cassius in Bonn and brother of Count Dietrich of Hochstaden instead, and in September 1192 he proceeded to Lüttich (Liège) to enforce the succession. The majority of the electors of Liège accepted the imperial decision because of the emperor's threat, and Albert de Rethel also relinquished and indignantly refused a financial settlement offered by the emperor. 

Margaritus was created Count of Malta in 1192 perhaps for his unexpected success of capturing the empress, granting him considerable resources.

Henry VI consistently refused to make peace with Tancred despite the capture of his wife; on his letter to Pope Celestine III to request the kingship of Tancred declared illegitimate, he even did not mention her captivity.  While he did not have the power to rescue her, Tancred would not permit Constance to be ransomed unless Henry recognized him. Henry complained to Celestine about the capture of his wife, so the Pope threatened to excommunicate Tancred if he did not release the Empress. (The Pope hoped that by securing Constance's safe passage back to Rome Henry would be better disposed towards the papacy and Celestine would be able to keep the Empire and Sicily from uniting.)  Finally, Tancred was willing to give up his negotiating advantage (i.e. possession of the Empress) if the Pope would legitimize him as King of Sicily.

Constance was released in 1192 with all her suites and some gifts, and delivered to Egidio Cardinal of Anagni from the Papal States. They traveled through the Strait of Messina, but before they made it to Rome they met imperial soldiers and the pro-Hohenstaufen abbot Roffredo of Montecassino, and Constance asked them for help; they were able to intercept the convoy at Ceprano despite the opposition of the cardinals and escorted her safely across the Alps, ensuring that in the end neither the papacy nor Sicily scored any real advantage in having had the Empress in their custody at all, only less than a month after her release; Within two weeks Henry and Constance reunited in the imperial castle of Trifels.

Second Expedition 
Henry was already preparing to invade Sicily a second time when Tancred died in February 1194. Later that year he moved south, leveled Salerno to the ground in revenge for arresting Constance, entered Palermo unopposed, deposed Tancred's young son William III (died 1198), and had himself crowned instead. Prior to that he agreed the request of Constance to enfeoff William County of Lecce and Principality of Taranto on November 20.

Queen of Sicily 
While Henry moved quickly south with his army, a pregnant Constance followed at a slower pace. On 26 December, the day after Henry was crowned at Palermo, she gave birth to a son, Frederick-Roger (the future Frederick II, Holy Roman Emperor and King of Sicily) in the small town of Iesi, near Ancona.

A story that Constance, aged 40 and after a marriage of 9 years, gave birth publicly in the town square to dispel doubt of her maternity, arose subsequently in rebuttal to later claims Frederick was not her son and is unfounded. 

When Henry returned to Germany in 1195, Constance ruled Sicily and issued diplomas in her own name. She was crowned as queen regnant on 2 April at Bari.

In 1196 Henry VI had Richard, Count of Acerra brother of Sibylla hanged in revenge for the capture of Constance.

On Good Friday in 1196, Constance summoned Joachim of Fiore to Palermo to hear her confession in Palatine chapel. Initially she sat on a raised chair, but when Joachim told her that as they were at the places of Christ and Mary Magdalene, she needed to lower herself, she sat on the ground.

However, the tyranny of Henry for Sicily initiated revolts, especially around Catania and southern Sicily. Henry wanted to placate Sicilians by naming Constance regent, but failed as Constance was merely viewed as his tool and could not stop him from making up Sicilian government dominated by German seneschal Markward von Anweiler and ensured by German troops. Henry crushed the rebellion of Jordan Lupin who claimed to be king of Sicily and received a gift of jewels from Constance. Henry had Jordan tortured to death in front of Constance in June 1197. Provoked by the neglect of Henry while pitying her countrymen, Constance also joined the revolts against her husband and besieged him in a castle, forcing him into a treaty.

Crowning of Frederick II and Her Death 

In 1197 Henry revisited Sicily, when there was a plot to murder him, which Constance and the Pope might be involved. Henry spent Easter with Constance in Palermo, and they still lived together and issued diplomas jointly. On July Henry managed to crush a rebellion; but on September Henry died unexpectedly - some said he was poisoned by Constance.

The following year Constance had the three-year-old Frederick crowned King of Sicily with herself as regent, and in his name dissolved the ties her late husband had created between the government of Sicily and the Empire. She adopted very different policies from those of her late consort. She surrounded herself with local advisors and excluded the ambitious Markward von Anweiler from a position of power, attempting to restrict him to his fief in Molise, as well as Walter of Palearia and Conrad I, Duke of Spoleto. She made no mention of any claims to the German kingship and empire when her son was anointed and crowned at Palermo, May 1198. While her own health becoming poor, Constance made warm overtures to the new pope Innocent III, abandoning the long-contended principle that the king was the apostolic legate, a central principle of Norman autonomy in the regno.  Faced with the dangers that surrounded any child-king, Constance placed Frederick under the protection of Pope Innocent III, who forced her to cede traditional royal rights over church councils, legates, appeals and elections, leaving her only the right to approve a bishop-elect before he could occupy his see. She issued diplomas jointly with Frederick after his coronation. While always maintaining her title of Holy Roman Empress Dowager, she expected her son to be raised as a Sicilian, and to be nothing more than King of Sicily, without distracting claims to Germany or even to the title "King of the Romans" to which her brother-in-law Philip of Swabia was acclaimed by the Roman nobles. That he became much more than that could not be predicted when she unexpectedly died in late November 1198, before the cardinal sent by the Pope to receive her homage arrived. In her will she set up a Council of Regency for Sicily and made Innocent, who was the child's feudal suzerain, his guardian, a reminder to all of the inviolability of his inheritance. She also instructed her subjects to swear fidelity to the Pope.

Biographer Jacqueline Alio infers that Constance and her sister-in-law Queen Dowager Margaret of Navarre knew each other and in her youth she might have intimated the style of leadership of Margaret, so they might have shared a sisterhood if tenuous. (Whether out of the will of Margaret or not, Constance was not released from her monastery during the lifetime of Margaret, who died in 1183.)

Constance was buried in the Cathedral of Palermo near the tomb of her father. Her death led to a period of violence and chaos till 1208 when Frederick had grown to his majority.

In the Divine Comedy, Dante places Constance in Paradise (though he subscribed to the story that Constance had been a nun):

Constance had arranged the marriage between her son and a princess of Aragon, which would occur in 1209.

Controversial Accounts

De Mulieribus Claris said that Constance was a daughter of King William I, and upon her birth a Calabrian abbot named Joachim told William that his daughter would cause the destruction of Sicily. William believed the prediction and shut young Constance up in a monastery and forced her to become a nun to prevent her having husband or children. When permitted to be betrothed to Henry she continuously objected for that she thought her advancing age would become an obstacle, but in vain, "Thus did a wrinkled crone abandon the sacred cloister, discard her monastic veil, and, royally adorned, marry and emerge in public as empress". This apparently contradicted the facts that Constance was indeed the posthumous daughter of Roger II and half-sister of William and she became empress in 1192. Giovanni Villani said William I sought to put her to death due to the prediction until Tancred a bastard son of Roger I, Count of Sicily persuaded him to send her to a convent.

Some said that it was Roger II who put Constance in a convent, which contradicted the fact that Constance was born after the death of Roger II.

Joachim Camerarius argued that Constance was simply sent to the convent during the coup against William I for her safety and stayed there until her betrothal without ever being a nun. Hugo Falcandus and Richard of San Germano argued Constance was brought up and educated in royal palace rather than a monastery. François Eudes de Mézeray said Constance had never become a nun.

Malespini and Boccaccio said she married at 50 and 55 respectively, and Brantôme argued that she married at 50 and gave birth at 52, while none was true. Florentine chroniclers said that Tancred annoyed the Pope so he and Archbishop of Palermo arranged the marriage of Constance to dethrone Tancred, and Tommaso Fazello said that according to decrees Celestine III absolved her from her vows, which contradicted the fact that Constance was betrothed during the reign of William II who would reign the next five years and Celestine was elected 7 years later; the chroniclers also said that it was wicked for the Pope to force Constance to give in her vows to marry, so Papal States was punished by the Heaven as the son born of the marriage of Constance would become its thorn.

An anonymous Vatican said in his Historia Sicula that the reason Constance did not marry before 30 was that she was too ugly, which could not be taken seriously, as political marriages seldom considered the looks of the parties.

Ancestry

See also
Hauteville family
History of Swabian Sicily

Notes

External links 
 Queens of Italy-Women in Power in Medieval Italy: CONSTANCE of HAUTEVILLE

Primary sources
Giovanni Villani, Cronica, V.20, VI.16, VII.1

Secondary sources

David Abulafia, Frederick II, a Medieval Emperor, 1988 (Oxford University press)
Jacqueline Alio, Queens of Sicily 1061-1266, 2018. 
Walter Fröhlich, "The Marriage of Henry VI and Constance of Sicily: Prelude and Consequences", Anglo-Norman Studies XV, 1992
 Donald Matthew, The Norman Kingdom of Sicily, 
 John Julius Norwich, The Kingdom in the Sun, reprinted as part of his The Normans in Sicily, 
Costanza, sacred opera performance at Our Lady of Mt. Carmel Church, Bronx, NY on 26 October 2008. John Marino, distinguished composer conductor, arranger, pianist, coordinated the performance. The libretto was written by Florence Bocarius.
Mary Taylor Simeti, Travels with a Medieval Queen, 2001. .

1154 births
1198 deaths
12th-century Kings of Sicily
12th-century Italian women
12th-century German women
Hauteville family
Queens regnant in Europe
Holy Roman Empresses
Italo-Normans
Burials at Palermo Cathedral
12th-century women rulers
Regents of Sicily
Sicilian princesses
Women in medieval European warfare
Women in 12th-century warfare
Nobility from Palermo
Women in war in Italy
Daughters of kings
German prisoners of war
Italian prisoners of war
Frederick II, Holy Roman Emperor
Children of Roger II of Sicily